Corus moisescoi is a species of beetle in the family Cerambycidae. It was described by Lepesme in 1946.

References

microphthalmus
Beetles described in 1946